The Senior Gold Cup is the current county cup for the Isle of Wight. It is administered by the Isle of Wight Divisional Football Association (IOWDFA). According to the current rules of the competition, it is open to only island clubs and, where applicable, their reserve teams. The current holders are Newport (IOW) F.C. who play in the Wessex League First Division.

History

The Senior Gold Cup was first contested in 1945. The most successful club in the competition's history is Newport who have won the cup on 41 occasions.

Winners

Clubs shown in bold indicate their last win and the number in the brackets indicates the number of wins at that time.

External links
Isle Of Wight Divisional Football Association

References

County Cup competitions